Kaaki Sattai is a 2015 Indian Tamil-language action thriller film co-written and directed by R. S. Durai Senthilkumar and produced by Dhanush, their second collaboration after Ethir Neechal (2013). The film stars Sivakarthikeyan and Sri Divya, Vijay Raaz and Prabhu. The film's music was composed by Anirudh Ravichander. The story revolves around police constable Mathimaran who wants to prove himself as a true, powerful cop by finding ways to solve issues of corruption in the law and order system in the department of police.

The film, which commenced filming in April 2014, released on 27 February 2015, to mostly positive reviews and became a box office success

Plot 
Mathimaran is a police constable who only reports to work and goes home daily without contributing anything useful to the society as his boss, Inspector Sathyamurthy, does not want to get on the wrong side of the upper levels of the police, who are corrupt and politically influenced, and is also unwilling to rock the present system due to past experience. Mathimaran and his fellow policemen never get any cases as a result, much to his irritation.

Mathimaran falls in love with Divya, who works as a nurse in a hospital, but hides his occupation from her as her family hates police officers. With her help, he finds out about an illegal organ donation racket orchestrated by a politician named Durai Arasan and Dr. Devasagayam, who is the chairman of the hospital where Divya works. They capture sick and injured migrant workers from North India, make them brain dead by administering them carbon monoxide instead of oxygen, and then harvest their organs, which they sell abroad for huge amounts of money. The organ donation scam gives Mathimaran his first real case, and he takes it on with enthusiasm after Sathyamurthy and Durai's estranged father Singaperumal, who had threatened to expose his son's misdeeds, are killed in a bomb blast orchestrated by Durai.

Mathimaran first confronts Devasagayam, who commits suicide, but not before admitting his role in the scam and giving detailed information about it. He then decides to confront Durai and get him arrested, but problem is that there is not enough evidence against Durai except Devasagayam's word, and Devasagayam is dead. He tries to get more information about Durai's role in the scam incognito. Unfortunately, Durai soon finds out that Mathimaran is after him, and a cat-and-mouse game begins between the two. In the process, Mathimaran is suspended from duty, as the police commissioner is close to Durai. Undaunted, he manages to expose the scam and Durai's involvement in it to the media, but Durai wriggles out of arrest.

Mathimaran decides to finish off Durai to end the scam once and for all. He creates a ruckus during a felicitation function for Durai. In the chaos that ensues, he shoots Durai in the leg and gives him the same treatment which had been meted out to the North Indian workers: administering him carbon monoxide and then harvesting his organs after he is declared brain dead. Durai's death is covered up as a terrorist attack. Mathimaran is eventually promoted to Inspector in reward for his efforts in thwarting the organ donation scam. He also gets accepted by Divya's family, despite being a police officer, and marries Divya.

Cast 

 Sivakarthikeyan as Mathimaran Rathnavel, a constable later Inspector
 Sri Divya as Divya, a nurse working at the Devasagayam hospital and Mathimaran's love interest
 Vijay Raaz as Durai Arasan, a corrupt politician and organ trader
 Prabhu as Sathyamurthy, R5 station inspector
 Kalpana as Meenakshi, Mathimaran's mother
 Yog Japee as Dr. Devasagayam, the owner of Devasagayam hospital. Helping Durai in human trade
 Manobala as Jyothi Lingam, MLA and Durai's henchman
 Mayilsamy as Sankara Narayanan alias Cyber Sanki / Sankiji Swamy
 Imman Annachi as Samarasam, R5 station head-constable
 E. Ramdoss as Subramanian, R5 station sub-inspector
 Nagineedu as Singaperumal, founder of man power agency and Durai Arasan's father
 Sujatha Sivakumar as Divya's mother
 Rail Ravi as Divya's father
 Yuvina Parthavi as Swetha, Divya's niece
 Vidyullekha Raman as Divya's friend
 Jeeva Ravi as Commissioner
 Suchithra Shivaraman as Mathimaran's sister
 Jangiri Madhumitha as a call girl
 Yogi Babu as Beggar
 Besant Ravi as Ravi
 Sampath Ram as Sampath, worker in man power agency but worked for Durai
 Singapore Deepan as Cyber Sanki teammate
 Raveendran
 Suryakanth
 Ravi Venkatraman
 Manohar
 Diwakar
 Douglas Moorthy
 Dhivya Raaven

Production

Development 
Soon after the release and success of Ethir Neechal (2013), the team of that film including producer Dhanush, director Durai Senthilkumar, music composer Anirudh Ravichander and actor Sivakarthikeyan announced that they would collaborate again for another venture. Pattukkottai Prabakar was selected to write the screenplay of the film. The film was initially titled Tina, but was changed to Kaaki Sattai after Kamal Haasan's 1985 film. In October 2014, the producers of Kamal Haasan's Kaakki Sattai were approached to obtain the rights for the title. Senthilkumar revealed that he had written the script keeping Dhanush in the mind while working as an assistant director for Aadukalam (2011). He narrated the script to Dhanush but failed to materialise but later he changed the script to suit Siva's comedic timing.

Casting 
The team held talks with and briefly signed Amala Paul as heroine, before she opted out. Sri Divya, seen opposite Sivakarthikeyan in Varuthapadatha Valibar Sangam (2013), was consequently signed on to play the lead female role. Actor Imman Annachi and Bollywood actor Vijay Raaz were roped in to play important roles. In June 2014, a newbie, Vinu Damodar, was selected to play a small but significant part in the film. His role was said to be a turning point in the protagonist's life. In August 2014, it was confirmed that veteran actor Prabhu was added to the cast in April 2014. Actor-director Manobala was selected to play a supporting role, which he confirmed on his Twitter page. The motion poster of the film was unveiled on 29 November 2014, which portrayed Sivakarthikeyan as a happy going man into an angry cop.

Filming 
Principal photography began with a puja ceremony held on 6 March 2014. The first schedule of the film's shoot began in March 2014 at a temple in Pammal near Pallavaram.
By April 2014, the movie completed 10 days shooting in an apartment in Mugappair and 'Semmozhi Poonga' in Cathedral Road, Chennai. The team continued shooting in and around Chennai. By June 2014, 40% of the movie had been completed and the second schedule began in Kerala. Several sequences were shot at Binny Mills. In July 2014, Sivakarthikeyan confirmed that 60% of the film was completed and the team would go to Norway to can two song sequences. When asked about whether the movie would undergo a name change, he clarified that the production unit was thinking of various possibilities and that if a suitable title did not come up, Taana would be the title used. As per Sivakarthikeyan's update, the team flew to Norway to can the song sequences from 1 September 2014 to 10 September 2014, which were choreographed by Sherif. The shoot returned to Chennai on 15 September 2014.

Music 

Anirudh Ravichander composed seven tracks for the soundtrack of the film. The album was launched at Radio Mirchi 98.3 on 12 December 2014, with the team opting to release the album to coincide with actor Rajinikanth's birthday. The song title "Kadhal Kan Kattuthe" later inspired a 2017 film of the same name.

Release

Theatrical 
The film had a release on over 750 screens in India.

Home media 
The television rights of the film were sold to Sun Network.

Reception

Box office

Critical reception 
IBTimes felt that "Overall, 'Kakki Sattai' is a decent masala mass entertainer and if you enjoy this genre, you can definitely hit the theatres and enjoy your time with this entertainer", rating the film 3.5/5. Indiaglitz rated Kaaki Sattai 3/5 and stated, "The 'Ethir Neechal' team has delivered one more winner here." Sify called the film "time-pass entertainment". Dailyindia called the film "a perfect commercial entertainer to watch this weekend for Siva and Anirudh" and rated it 3 out of 5. Cinematime also rated Kaaki Sattai 3/5 and said that Siva's performance and Anirudh's music "makes your weekend awesome".  Deccan Chronicle rated it 2.5/5 and wrote that director "Durai Senthilkumar and actor Sivakarthikeyan have done an estimable job in making the film at least worth experiencing." Behindwoods gave the film 2.5 out of 5 and opined: "Siva Karthikeyan entertains, but the story's handling could have been better." Filmibeat awarded the film 2.5/5 and summarised: "Apart from Sivakarthikeyan and Anirudh's music, Kaaki Sattai doesn't provide anything extraordinary. It can be termed as old wine in a new bottle with too many fun elements for a cop story." Baradwaj Rangan of the Hindu wrote "As overlong, utterly generic, badly written, indifferently made action-comedy star vehicles propelled by Anirudh’s growling guitar riffs go, Kaaki Sattai is as disposable as they come."

References

External links 
 

2015 films
2015 action films
Indian action films
2010s Tamil-language films
2010s masala films
Fictional portrayals of the Tamil Nadu Police
Films scored by Anirudh Ravichander
Films about organ trafficking
Law enforcement in fiction